Ranbir Singh Mahendra is a politician in the Indian National Congress from Haryana, India and was President of Board for Control of Cricket in India (BCCI) from 2004 to 2005. He is the son of former Haryana chief minister Bansi Lal.

Politics

Mahendra represented the Mundhal constituency in the Haryana Legislative Assembly.

Cricket administration 

He joined the BCCI in 1975, and ascended to the post of joint secretary in 1980. In 1985, he was elevated to the post of secretary, which he held for five years. He was one of the key administrators during the 1987 World Cup held in India, and was the driving force behind the Haryana Cricket Association. In 2001, he was elected as one of the vice presidents of the board.

Personal life 

Mahendra is a lawyer by profession. He is the son of Bansi Lal, a prominent politician who served as Chief Minister of Haryana, Railway Minister and Defence Minister of India. Mahendra's son, Anirudh Chaudhry has served as the treasurer of the BCCI.

References 

Cricketers from Haryana
Living people
Indian cricket administrators
Indian sports executives and administrators
Presidents of the Board of Control for Cricket in India
Indian National Congress politicians
Members of the Haryana Legislative Assembly
Year of birth missing (living people)